Mangina may refer to:

Mangina, a genus of moth
Phyllis Mangina, American basketball coach
Mangina, a city in the Democratic Republic of the Congo
Mangina, a derogatory term aimed at male feminists.